Allensworth School District is a public school district in the town of Allensworth in Tulare County, California. It includes a single school serving grades K through 8.

Demographics 
 Economically disadvantaged 97.2%
 English language learners 53.8%
 Students with disabilities 0.0%
 American Indian 0.0%
 Asian 0.0%
 Pacific Islander 0.0%
 Filipino 0.0%
 Hispanic 56.9%
 African American 43.1%
 White 0.0%
 Multiple/no response 0.0%

References

External links
 

School districts in Tulare County, California